The Republic of Peru is a unitary state with a multi-party semi-presidential system. The current government was established by the 1993 Constitution of Peru. The government is composed of three branches, being  executive, judicial, and legislative branches.

Executive branch 

|President
|Dina Boluarte
|Independent
|7 December 2022
|-
|First Vice President
|Vacant
|N/A
|7 December 2022
|-
|Second Vice President
|Vacant
|N/A
|7 May 2020
|-
|Prime Minister
|Alberto Otárola
|Independent
|21 December 2022
|}

The President of Peru is the head of state and the head of government, who is elected to a term of five years; incumbents cannot be re-elected for a second consecutive term. Family members may also not immediately succeed in another family member's presidency. The executive branch, in addition to the legislative branch, may propose legislation. After legislation has been passed by the congress, the President may promulgate the legislation, giving it the force of law.

In addition to the president, the executive branch contains the Council of Ministers, which, in addition to the prime minister, are appointed by the president.

Requirements to be Minister of State 
According to Article 124 of the Political Constitution of Peru (1993), in order to be Minister, it is required:
Be a natural born citizen.
Be a current citizen.
Be 25 years old or older.
Members of the Armed Forces and National Police can be Ministers.

Article 92 states that members of Congress can be Ministers of State.

Functions 
Run the process of strategic planning, embedded in the National System of Strategic Planning and determining the sector's functional national goals applicable to every level of government; approve action plans; assign necessary resources to their execution, within the boundaries of the corresponding public budget.
Approve the budget proposal to the entities within their sector, abiding by article 32 and supervising their execution.
Establish the management measurements of the entities within their sector and evaluate their fulfillment.
Propose the inner organization of their Ministry and approve it according to their competencies attributed by Law.
Designate and remove the advising positions or any directly appointed, the heads of public entities and other entities of the sector, when this appointment is not explicitly attributed to the Council of Ministries, other authorities or the President; and submit to the President the new appointees for approval on the contrary.
Maintain relations with the regional and local government within the competencies attributed to the sector.
Countersign the presidential mandates that concern to their Ministry
Issue Supreme Resolution and Ministerial Resolutions.
Put into effect the transfer of competencies, functions, and sectorial resources to Regional and Local Government and account for their execution.
Execute all other functions that are put upon the Ministry by the Political Constitution of Peru, the Law, and the President.mlg

The Ministers of State can delegate, within their Ministry, the faculties and powers that are not exclusive to their function, to the extent that it is allowed by Law. Functions 2, 4, 5, 7, and 8 are exclusive to the Minister.

Ministries of Peru

Judicial branch 

The judicial branch is represented by the Supreme Court Of Justice, a 16-member body divided into three supreme sectors:
Civil Sector: Presides over all topics related to civil rights and commercial law.
Criminal Sector: Presides over all topics relating to criminal law.
Constitutional and Social Sector: Presides over all topics relating to constitutional rights and labor law.

Legislative branch 

The legislative branch of Peru is vested in the Congress of the Republic of Peru, which is a 130-member unicameral house. The legislators are elected for five-year terms on a proportional representation basis. The legislation is voted on in Congress, then sent to the president, who may approve it.

Due to broadly interpreted impeachment wording in the 1993 Constitution of Peru, the Congress can impeach the President of Peru without cause, effectively making the legislature more powerful than the executive branch. Following a ruling in February 2023 by the Constitutional Court of Peru, whose members are elected by Congress, judicial oversight of the legislative body was also removed by the court, essentially giving Congress absolute control of Peru's government.

Suffrage 

Universal suffrage is granted to all over the age of 18. Voting is compulsory until the age of 70. Some argue whether compulsive voting is for the best of the country and the citizens. Enforced strictly, with exceptions.

See also 
Municipalities of Peru
Politics of Peru
Regional Governments of Peru

Notes and references